KJMM (105.3 MHz) is a commercial FM radio station licensed to Bixby, Oklahoma, and serving the Greater Tulsa radio market. It is owned by Perry Publishing and Broadcasting and it has an urban contemporary radio format.  KJMM carries a nationally syndicated wake up show on weekdays, "The Morning Hustle," based at KBFB Dallas.  KJMM's studios are in the Copper Oaks complex in South Tulsa.

KJMM has an effective radiated power (ERP) of 10,000 watts.  The transmitter site is on South 186th Street East in Haskell, Oklahoma.

History
It was one of three original Urban stations launched with the help of Perry Broadcasting, an African-American-based media company. KJMM is part of the "Power Jammin'" network, along with KVSP in Oklahoma City and KJMZ in Lawton.  

The owner believed the African-American community was underserved in the radio media. At that point there was one FM radio station aimed at the Tulsa African-American community.  It was KTOW-FM Sand Springs, "Mix 102.3" (now talk radio KRMG-FM).  Its DJs were KK Holliday 7pm-12am, Keith "Sergio Lacour" Samuels 3pm-7pm afternoon drive, Angel Craig 10am-3pm and Aaron Bernard 6am-10am and Nikki 12am-6am.  Perry offered better salaries and took most of the DJs from Mix 102.3, hiring them to establish his competitor station on 105.3 MHz. 

The station plays Hip Hop, R&B, Rap and Urban Gospel on Sunday mornings.  It was originally called Fresh Jamz 105. In 2004, KJMM changed its moniker to 105.3 K-Jamz.  It began carrying "The Doug Banks Morning Show," while sending the previously morning program, "The Tom Joyner Morning Show" to sister station KGTO, an Urban AC station at 1050 AM and 99.1 FM.  In December 2007, KJMM became the new affiliate of the Los Angeles-based "Big Boy's Neighborhood," replacing Doug Banks.  "The Rickey Smiley Morning Show" later replaced Big Boy's Neighborhood in the morning on KJMM. 

In January 2020, "The Rickey Smiley Morning Show" was sent to sister station KGTO when that station lost The Tom Joyner Morning Show as Joyner stepped away from the program.   KJMM became an affiliate of the new syndicated urban morning show "The Morning Hustle" hosted by rapper and former member of The Rickey Smiley Morning Show, Headkrack.  His co-host is rapper Lore’l.  The Morning Hustle airs from 5 to 9 a.m. weekdays.

References

External links
KJMM station website
Perry Publishing and Broadcasting

African-American history in Tulsa, Oklahoma
JMM
Mainstream urban radio stations in the United States